The list of ship commissionings in 1984 includes a chronological list of all ships commissioned in 1984.


See also 

1984
 Ship commissionings